EHE or Ehe may refer to:
 Epithelioid hemangioendothelioma, a type of tumor
 Extreme helium star, a type of star
 Elective home education, a form of education
 Marriage (1929 film), a 1929 German silent film